Football Club Karpaty Lviv is a Ukrainian professional football club based in Lviv.

History

Early years (1963–68)
The team of Karpaty was founded on 18 January, 1963. In 1961 Silmash Lviv won the championship of Lviv Oblast but lost its promotional play-off against Naftovyk Drohobych to qualify for the Soviet Class B championship. In 1962 Silmash Lviv won the championship and cup of the Lviv Oblast (see Lviv Oblast Football Federation) and won the promotional play-offs against Naftovyk, obtaining the rights to participate in the Soviet Class B championship (Soviet First League). However, in 1963 the Football Federation of USSR conducted another reorganization in football national tournaments creating the Second Group of Class A and Class B became the third tier where a berth was reserved for a team from Lviv. At that time the best city team was SKA Lvov, players of which did not stay there for long, leaving it at the end of their military service, while the best would be drafted to CSKA Moscow. In light of that the city administration decided to create a civilian team, independent from the Soviet military.

In December 1962, in the building of Regional Council of Trade Unions (at prospekt Shevchenka), the head of the council and the regional football federation, Hlib Klymov, invited coaches of Silmash – Yuri Zubach (former player of Ukraina Lwów) and Vasyl Solomonko, as well as the director of the city plant "Lvivsilmash" Ivan Kalynychenko to discuss a new name for the club. The name Silmash was recognized as inadequate for participation on such a level. Among the proposed names were Spartak, Dynamo, Halychyna, while at the end they agreed upon the regional toponym Karpaty (Carpathians).

In the Soviet times all sport teams were "tied" to certain industrial unions or sport societies, therefore Karpaty joined the republican sport society of trade unions "Avanhard", while the Lviv Television Production Plant "Elektron" became its sponsor. Out of "Silmash" only two joined Karpaty: Ihor Kulchytskyi and Josef Fales. Karpaty also adopted the same jersey colors of Silmash. Also the club was reinforced with several players from SKA Lvov and transfers. The club played its first game on 14 April 1964 against Zenit Izhevsk at the Dynamo Stadium (today – the location of the building of the Regional Tax Administration) winning it 1–0. The goal was scored by the club's captain Oleksandr Filiayev. The first official game was against Lokomotiv Gomel on 23 April 1963, which Karpaty won 1–0 (goal scored by Anatoliy Kroshchenko).

Karpaty debuted in Group B in 1963 and remained there for four seasons, until in 1968 they were promoted to Soviet First League.

Winning the USSR Cup

On 17 August 1969, Karpaty became the first (and the only) club in the USSR football history to win the USSR Cup while playing in the Soviet First League. The road to the cup was no less exciting as the final itself. On the way there the Lions were challenged by such Soviet heavy-weights as Ararat Yerevan and Chornomorets Odesa. The quarterfinal round matched them with Trud Voronezh that in the prior round had eliminated Spartak Moscow. After a narrow victory over Voronezh, Karpaty faced Mykolaiv's Shipbuilders. The game was perceived by the Lvivians as the chance to avenge the previous year's loss to the Mykolaivans, which cost them a ticket to the Soviet Premiership. A score of 2–0 was enough to secure a trip to Moscow.

In the final, Karpaty faced the Red Army team from Rostov-on-Don at the Lenin Stadium. The Rostov army-men were one of the best Soviet clubs in the mid-1960s and for that game they were considered as the favorites being the representatives of the Soviet Top League. Before the start of the game Karpaty's captain Ihor Kulchytskyi  shook hands in the traditional manner with every match official, except the assistant referee, Eugen Härms. The reason was that Härms, the Estonian referee in charge of their game a year earlier against Uralmash Sverdlovsk, allowed a goal from what was regarded as an obvious offside position that eventually contributed to Karpaty's denial of a promotion. Karpaty were trailing 0–1 already after the first 20 minutes and to the end of the half were not able to equalize, but numerous Karpaty's fans drove their team forward.

(Petro Danylchuk, "Karpaty" defender)

(Ihor Kulchytsky, "Karpaty" captain)
In the second half the Ukrainians broke the course of the game flow and two goals from Lykhachov and Bulhakov put the Lions ahead. Near the end of the game the Rostov team scored another goal, but it was given offside. The match referee, without consulting his assistants, initially allowed the goal and the Russians ran joyfully towards the center of the field. However, a moment later, he noticed the raised flag from Härms who had identified an offside and reversed his decision, awarding the victory to Lviv.

In the following season, Karpaty's first opponent in the UEFA Cup Winners' Cup was Romanian Steaua București that, led by István Kovács, advanced on a 4–3 aggregate.

Soviet Top League (1970–1977)
In 1970–77 and 1980, Karpaty played in the Soviet Top League. Karpaty's best achievement was 4th place in 1976. Karpaty placed 4th twice that year since the season was split into 2 separate championships (spring and fall). Karpaty were primed to win silver that season, but an unexpected loss in their last home game to Zenit Leningrad pushed Karpaty back into 4th place.

While playing in the Soviet First League in 1979, Karpaty were close to repeating their 1969 achievement, when they met Dynamo Moscow in the USSR Cup semi-final. The match, which was played in Moscow, went into overtime with a 1–1 score with Dynamo prevailing in the end, scoring a penalty kick in extra time.

SKA Karpaty (1981–1989)
In 1981, Karpaty were merged with another city team, SKA Lviv belonging to the Carpathian Military District. In 1980 Karpaty were relegated from the Soviet Top League (Vysshaya Liga) and in the 1981 Soviet First League placed only 11th. Already before the season's finish there appeared rumors about possible merger. The logic of authors of that decision was in following, the city is receiving one, but strong and competitive team. In January 1982 the leaders of regional football ultimately decided to unite to clubs. It was motivated by the fact that it is difficult to finance two teams. As a result, Karpaty were liquidated and their place in the Soviet First League was taken by army team SKA Karpaty that was established in place of SKA Lvov. The new team was gathered from players of SKA, Karpaty, and several other who have recently arrived. The head coach became Russian Nikolay Samarin. It is believed that Ukrainian and Soviet coach Valeriy Lobanovskyi commented on liquidation of Karpaty, that it is a disaster of football in all western region of the republic. That it would take not single decade before they realize the whole tragedy of this merger.

The newly created SKA Karpaty were playing in red and white colors, and traditional green and white colors were banned. Militsiya were watching that fans would not bring to stands any green markings. The club's attendance fell immediately. Back in 1980 the Karpaty's home games were visited on average by 20-25 thousands spectators. In the first season after merging of the Lviv teams at stadium were gathering about 5-6 thousands spectators. The newly arrived footballers also did not stay long with the army club and were leaving as soon as their military service was terminated.

SKA Karpaty continued playing in the Soviet First League until 1989, getting close to promotion in 1986, when CSKA Moscow was promoted ahead of Karpaty on goal difference. As their highest achievement, SKA Karpaty placed third place twice while being coached by Volodymyr Bulhakov. After that their performance worsened. If in 1987 the club managed to place the fifth place, after two more years it literally hit the hard bottom placing dead last. It lost 18 of its 21 away games and its losing streak reached 15 games. To one of home games came to watch only 54 spectators, which was the absolute anti-record of the season.

Revival
The Karpaty's revival started with publication in a newspaper. In 1983 journalist and writer Ivan Salo wrote a critical article "Football... outside of play" (in Ukrainian "outside of play" phrase is actually used for football term of offside). Now due to censorship in the Soviet Union, it dared to be printed only in four years in newspaper "Leninska molod" (The Lenin's Youth). The author was demanding to separate SKA Karpaty into two teams as it was earlier. The subject was expanded by "Sportyvna Hazeta" (The Sports Gazette). In November–December 1988 the publisher held a rally "Ya, mama, tato – za komandu Karpaty" (Mother, father and I – for the Karpaty team). The newspaper succeeded to gather 70,000 signatures from the whole Ukraine. After that the case actually moved from standstill. The Lviv delegation departed to Kyiv for negotiations with republican football federation (Ukrainian SSR, precursor of UAF). Negotiations also were held with Moscow.

Finally on 5 January 1989 at 15:00 in office No.290 of the State Committee on Sports of the Soviet Union at Luzhniki Embankment in Moscow was signed the certificate about revival of the Karpaty football team. His signature placed the future president of the Football Federation of the Soviet Union Vyacheslav Koloskov. And on 10 January in "Sportyvna Hazeta" was printed a text titled "The birthday of the club". It has been seven years from the moment of the Karpaty's liquidation. The Lions began to play from the Second League (Zone 5, not "Ukrainian"), and SKA continued to play in the First.

The revival of the club was taken over by leadership of the Elektron Factory, at facilities of which in 1963 Karpaty were actually created. In 2019 already the late Yuriy Dyachuk-Stavytskyi was telling, "At that time I worked as a head coach of Prykarpattia Ivano-Frankivsk. To Lviv I was invited along with Rostyslav Zaremba (at that time he headed a club of the Karpaty football fans). We were told that the club needed to be moved ahead. For office we were allotted a space at vulytsia Dudaieva. On the third story there were two rooms. We found couple of chairs and a magazine table. I brought my personal typewriter, many people remember it. My friends laughed at me telling "Why do you need this?" The same thing was told Rostyslav as both of us came to an empty lot de facto.

However, in renewed Karpaty gathered a battle-ready team as to Lviv returned a good number of local "fosterlings" (former recruits) such as Stepan Yurchyshyn, Serhiy Kvasnykov, Viktor Rafalchuk, Hryhoriy Batych, Vasyl Leskiv, Bohdan Bandura and others. A squad chief became Ihor Kulchytskyi, as a head coach was appointed Borys Rossykhin, while his assistant became Rostyslav Potochniak. Companies were transferring us their funds, and people were simply bringing in their caps their money that they gathered at the city's streets. So, I ask you not to be confused, the football team was created in 1963, and the club – in 1989. (Many football teams were forced to adopt the Soviet policy of khozraschyot during that period, some earlier than others.) Those are two important historical dates".

Ukrainian League (1991–present)
Since Ukraine gained its independence, Karpaty have primarily participated in Ukrainian Premier League competitions. They reached 3rd place in 1997–98, their highest Ukrainian top division finish to date, and were Ukrainian Cup runners-up twice, losing both times to Dynamo Kyiv in the final.

The thirteenth season in Ukrainian Premier League became an unfortunate one for Karpaty and in the 2003–04 season the team was relegated to the Persha Liha. However, Karpaty remained there only for two seasons and in the 2005–06 season, the club was successful in taking second place in the Persha Liha, which promoted them to the Vyscha Liha the following year.

In August 2017 the president of the club Petro Dyminskyi while driving near Lviv ran into another car killing a younger lady. Few days later he left Ukraine on a private jet as the police started investigation. In December 2017 the district court in Kyiv gave an order to detain him and asked Interpol for assistance. In 2018 Dyminskyi appealed to Interpol to ignore the request. Dyminskyi is still at large and hiding.

It was then Oleh Smaliychuk became among main executives of the club as a vice-president. Karpaty avoided relegation in previous 2016–17 season due to administrative sanctions that were imposed against FC Dnipro. In June 2017 Karpaty replaced its head coach with foreign specialist Sergio Navarro, while Argentinian Dario Drudi who recently worked in FC Zirka Kropyvnytskyi became the club's executive director. To the club were also brought several Spanish speaking players.

The club poorly started its 2017–18 season losing at home to the newly promoted NK Veres Rivne that temporarily moved to Lviv (1:6) which led fans requesting players to undress their uniform and stop to disgrace the club's colors. Following the loss Navarro resigned and was replaced with Serhiy Zaytsev, but that did not help a lot. The club still struggled and after the away cup game loss against the Second League FC Prykarpattia Ivano-Frankivsk (1:2), the club's hooligans began mass riots at the stadium, brawl with the local police and stopped the bus with the returning Karpaty near Lviv. Following another home loss to FC Mariupol and remaining at the 11th place (out of 12), Zaitsev left the post and was replaced Oleh Boychyshyn. The new coach managed improve the club's table standing during the second half and the club cleared the relegation zone.

Following somewhat poor start in the 2018–19 with two home losses in four games Boychyshyn was replaced with José Morais. The club's form did not improve much and after view surprising away wins against FC Dynamo Kyiv and FC Chornomorets Odesa, Karpaty still continued to struggle to clear the relegation zone. At the end of November 2018 the Portuguese head coach left for Korea and Boychyshyn took over as interim. However, before the end of the half the club following this coach swap returned to the relegation zone. During the winter break to the club was brought another Spanish specialist Fabri González who was supposed to refresh the club, however his efforts were meager and the club remained at its 10th place. Fabri also failed to win against FC Inhulets Petrove in the domestic quarterfinals that played in a tier lower. Just before the finish Fabri was replaced with Oleksandr Chyzhevskyi who managed to win against the struggling FC Arsenal Kyiv and relegation play-off against FC Volyn Lutsk. An excellent season had a prospect player Marian Shved who just turned 22 and finished the season third on the top scorers list with 14 tallies. He also was traded away to the Scottish Celtic F.C., but remained with Karpaty on loan until the season's end.

The 2020 crisis
As in the previous season, the club again struggled to get out of the relegation zone in 2019-20. Although the league was scheduled to expand the following season, which would reduce the number of relegated teams, this did not help Karpaty. After 6 games the club remained 11th out of 12 and Chyzhevskyi was replaced with Roman Sanzhar. The change of coaches was not successful as the club by the midway point of the season hit bottom of the table and also suffered elimination from the domestic cup in the first round against FC Inhulets Petrove. As the club was leaving for the winter break, COVID-19 pandemic started to develop in Chinese Wuhan. The competitions resumed before introduction of quarantine and the UPL managed to finish the competition's first stage where Karpaty finished dead last. Soon after the UPL started its second stage of competitions all sports events in Ukraine were placed on halt on 18 March following the worldwide crisis. Sometime in May it was announced that Oleh Smaliychuk bought out a control package from Petro Dyminskyi who continued to hide from the law. After two months of quarantine, the UPL competitions renewed on 30 May. However, The UPL administration decided not to conduct the game Karpaty – Mariupol on 31 May 2020 as in the Lviv's team camp were found positive test results on COVID-19. FC Mariupol that was already on the way to the game was forced to turn around. On 2 June 2020 FC Karpaty Lviv released its official statement announcing that the club goes on 2 weeks self-isolation due to mass spread of the illness among players. The upcoming games with SC Dnipro-1 and Vorskla Poltava will not take place as previously scheduled. On 26 June 2020 were announced new rescheduled dates for the Karpaty's games against Mariupol and Dnipro-1. About a month later on 27 June they finally met in derby game against FC Lviv and promised to finish all their games they owed to other clubs before the new end of season on 19 July. But later Karpaty started to complain that the schedule is too tight and they won't be able to comply with the new schedule and refused to travel to any other games at all leaving on early vacations on 10 July. On 30 June 2020 the Ukrainian Premier League filed a document to the UAF Control and Disciplinary Committee informing that FC Karpaty Lviv were not able to show up for the game in Mariupol on 1 July 2020. The Mariupol–Karpaty game scheduled on 4 July will not take place. As it was the second failure to appear to the match for FC Karpaty Lviv, according to regulations the club was expelled from the championship by the UAF Control-Disciplinary Committee on 9 July 2020. The club was counted two technical defeats for two matches against FC Mariupol as 3:0 and 0:3. For all other remaining games that were due to play the club was counted -:+. On 22 July the UAF decision became final as the club did not appeal it.

On 31 July 2020 Smaliychuk announced that Karpaty would play in the Second League. In the beginning of August 2020 there surfaced information that Karpaty might even be able to play in the First League. On 14 August 2020 it was announced that the club never submitted registration for either the First or Second leagues. On 20 August 2020 it became confirmed that Karpaty will be actually playing in the Second League.

The 2021 club reorganization
The club underwent a considerable transformation in the summer of 2021. Owned by Petro Dyminskyi between 2001 and 2020, the Karpaty ownership was claimed either partially or entirely by Oleh Smaliychuk. 
In 2020 the club announced its bankruptcy and was expelled from the Ukrainian Premier League, yet allowed to enter competitions in lower leagues and maintain professional status. In the autumn of 2020, veteran Karpaty Lviv players Stepan Yurchyshyn, Andriy Tlumak and others created another club by the same name that entered the national amateur competitions. The next season the Smaliychuk's Karpaty were relegated and finally announced to be dissolved - Yurchyshyn's Karpaty were promoted to take their place in the league. During the 2020–21 Ukrainian Second League Karpaty temporarily played with a different logo. 
On 14 July 2021 Smaliychuk announced that the club was dissolved and would not participate in the amateur championship after relegating from the Second League. He promised to continue the work by repaying club's old debts.

Stadium

Main articles: Ukraina Stadium and Arena Lviv

FC Karpaty play their home games at the Ukraina Stadium. The stadium was built in 1963 as Druzhba ('Friendship") Stadium and renamed into Ukraina Stadium in 1992. The stadium was renovated on several occasions since, the latest one taking place in 2001. Currently the arena has a capacity of 29,004 spectators.

The stadium was also the venue hosting the final match of the first Ukrainian Premier League season in 1992, in which Tavriya Simferopol defeated Dynamo Kyiv.

It has also been one of the venues for Ukraine national football team matches, the most recent being a 1–0 win over Belarus on 6 September 2008 during 2010 FIFA World Cup qualifying.

Logo history
Since the club has been named after the Carpathian Mountains, the image of the forest and mountains has been present on team's logo for many years. However, the logo has since been updated, inspired by coat of arms of Lviv with a segment of a fortress and lion shown on the new crest. The club's nickname 'The Green Lions' also originated from their new logo.

The club also has a ceremonial logo, however, it is very rarely used, mostly during TV broadcasts or video packages.

Football kits and sponsors

Colours
Traditionally the club colours have been white and green. Throughout the club's history its kit has always been designed in green and white colours; other colours are almost never used and are usually highly criticized by fans.

Green is considered to be the dominant of the two in club nicknames like "Green Lions" and "Green-Whites". For some time black was also used and was even displayed on one of the club's former logos.

Rivalries
Karpaty's biggest rivals today are Volyn Lutsk and FC Lviv. The match against FC Volyn Lutsk is called the Galician-Volhynian rivalry (derby) which is the main football event in western Ukraine. Derby with FC Lviv has shorter history (six matches by the end of 2019)

Galician–Volhynian rivalry

Former rivalries
Karpaty became the longest surviving city's professional football club and over the years participated in Lviv city derbies with SKA Lvov (in 1966–1969) before the club was dissolved.

In the beginning of the 1990s a rivalry with FC Nyva Ternopil became overshadowed by the rivalry with FC Volyn Lutsk as the Ternopil club was relegated from the top division in 2001.

Supporters

	

Karpaty Lviv is among the most popular clubs in Ukraine and according to social polls of local polling organizations such as "RATING" and KIIS that were conducted in 2013 it was claimed that 2.7% to 5.6% of all football fans in Ukraine support the club (sharing the 3rd-5th place in the country). 

Just before being appointed a director of the Moscow studio of Deutsche Welle, German journalist Markus Reher wrote an article in which he claimed that Ukraine is not ready to hold an event such as 2012 UEFA Euro, because there are too many "nationalist thugs" and neo-Nazis, particularly referring to Karpaty supporters. In the article an interviewed Karpaty supporter claims that supporters of the club "don't start fights" and are "just giving their team support". The supporter went on to say that "everything'll be fine" if supporters of other clubs don't provoke him or other supporters of Karpaty Lviv, and if they had foreign players at the club, they would send them back home if they could. The article claimed that the club protects its players from its nationalist fans, and Danilo Avelar, a player from Brazil, stated that he "hasn't heard of nationalist fans and hopes it isn't true". The article goes on to report that authorities have had problems in the past with violent fans in Lviv, citing a riot in Lviv's old town when ultranationalist Karpaty supporters clashed with supporters of German side Borussia Dortmund with injuries on both sides. Detailing the pre-independence history of the team, British correspondent Manuel Veth notes that the nickname Banderstadt later adopted by football ultras was given by "Soviet anti-terrorist forces" for the city's role in the Ukrainian Insurgent Army's nationalist guerrilla campaign. The American journalist Michael Goldfarb pointed out that demonstration of antisemitism and xenophobia among the Karpaty Lviv fans could be politically influenced and is not uncommon in region including similar instances in neighboring Poland.

FC Karpaty Lviv in European competitions
Karpaty made its debut in European tournaments at the 1970–71 European Cup Winners' Cup, being eliminated by FC Steaua București in the first round. Just four visits to European competition have followed, the most successful being a run to the Group Stage of the 2010–11 UEFA Europa League.

UEFA club coefficient ranking
As of 06.06.2016 (no ranking for 2017), Source:

Honours

Domestic

Soviet Union
Soviet Cup
Winners (1): 1969
Soviet First League
Winners (2): 1970, 1979
Soviet Second League
Winners (1): 1991 (Zone West)

Ukraine
Ukrainian Premier League U–21
Winners (1): 2009–10
Ukrainian Cup
Runners-up (2): 1992–93, 1998–99
Ukrainian First League
Runners-up (1): 2004–05

Non-official
Copa del Sol
Winners (1): 2011

Players

Current squad

Staff and management

Administration history

President
 1999–2001: Leonid Tkachuk
 2001–2020: Petro Dyminskyi
 2020–2021: Oleh Smaliychuk
 2020–present: Stepan Yurchyshyn

General director

 1999–2001: Ivan Lypnytskyi
 2001: Oleksandr Yefremov
 2001–2004: Mykhaylo Praktyka
 2004: Petro Komar
 2004–2005: Yuriy Dyachuk-Stavytskyi
 2005–2006: Bohdan Fedoryshyn
 2006: Vasyl Ravryk

 2006–2008: Oleksandr Yefremov
 2008–2009: Yuriy Dyachuk-Stavytskyi
 2009: Yuriy Korotysh
 2009–2015: Ihor Dedyshyn
 2015–2017: Yuriy Dyachuk-Stavytskyi
 2017–2020: Yuriy Korotysh

League and Cup history

Soviet Union

Ukraine

Coaches

First team

 Sergei Korshunov (1964–65)
 Nikolay Dementyev (1965–66)
 Yevhen Lemeshko (1967)
 Valentin Bubukin (1972–74)
 Ishtvan Sekech (1978–80)
 Stepan Yurchyshyn (1992)
 Myron Markevych (1 July 1992 – 30 June 1995)
 Volodymyr Zhuravchak (1995–96), (2002)
 Myron Markevych (1 July 1996 – 1 March 1999)
 Stepan Yurchyshyn (1999)
 Lev Brovarskyi (1999–00)
 Stepan Yurchyshyn (2001)
 Myron Markevych (1 July 2001 – 30 June 2002)
 Valentyn Khodukin (Sept 15, 2002 – 31 Dec 2002)
 Myron Markevych (1 Jan 2003 – 30 June 2004)
 Valentyn Khodukin (July 2004 – Sept 2004)
 Yuriy Dyachuk-Stavytskyi (Sept 15, 2004 – 30 June 2006)
 Oleksandr Ishchenko (1 July 2006 – 1 Jan 2008)
 Valeriy Yaremchenko (1 Jan 2008 – 30 May 2008)
 Oleg Kononov (20 May 2008 – 18 Oct 2011)
 Pavel Kucherov (interim) (18 Oct 2011 – 21 Jan 2012)
 Volodymyr Sharan (21 Jan 2012 – 26 March 2012)
 Yuriy Dyachuk-Stavytskyi (26 March 2012 – 8 June 2012)
 Pavel Kucherov (interim) (8 June 2012 – 30 July 2012)
 Nikolay Kostov (29 July 2012 – 10 May 2013)
 Yuriy Dyachuk-Stavytskyi (interim) (10 May 2013 – 18 June 2013)
 Oleksandr Sevidov (19 June 2013 – 17 June 2014)
 Igor Jovićević (caretaker) (18 June 2014 – 1 September 2015)
 Igor Jovićević (1 September 2015 – 12 January 2016)
 Oleh Luzhnyi / Volodymyr Bezubyak (Jan 2016 – June 2016)
 Valeriy Yaremchenko (June, 6 – 17 June 2016)
 Anatoliy Chantsev (caretaker) (17 June 2016 – 5 July 2016)
 Serhiy Zaytsev (5 July 2016 – 7 October 2016)
 Oleg Dulub (7 October 2016 – 11 June 2017)
 Sergio Navarro (16 June 2017 – 14 Sep 2017)
 Serhiy Zaytsev (14 Sep 2017 – 19 Nov 2017)
 Dario Drudi (caretaker) (19 Nov 2017 – 21 Nov 2017)
 Oleh Boychyshyn (21 Nov 2017 – 16 Aug 2018)
 José Morais (16 Aug 2018 – 28 Nov 2018)
 Oleh Boychyshyn (caretaker) (28 Nov 2018 – 13 Jan 2019)
 Fabri González (13 Jan 2019 – 27 May 2019)
 Oleksandr Chyzhevskyi (27 May 2019 – 3 Sep 2019)
 Roman Sanzhar (3 Sep 2019 – 29 July 2020)
 Lyubomyr Vovchuk (23 August 2020 – 14 July 2021)
 Andriy Tlumak (October 2020 – present)

Reserve team
 Roman Tolochko (2007 – 2013)
 Andriy Kuptsov (2013 – 2015)
 Andriy Tlumak (2016)
 Oleksandr Chyzhevskyi (2016 – 2019)

Notable managers
 Ernest Yust, Soviet Cup, Class A (pervaya gruppa) winner, Soviet Top League fourth place
 Ishtvan Sekech, Soviet First League winner
 Stepan Yurchyshyn, Soviet Second League winner
 Myron Markevych, Ukrainian Top League third place

See also
FC Karpaty-2 Lviv
FC Karpaty-3 Lviv
FC Karpaty Lviv Reserves and Youth Team
EUROFANZ

References

External links

Official website
Fan site
 Readmission of FC Karpaty Lviv to professional football (Oleksandr Shevchenko is a president of Lviv Oblast Association of Football whom Smaliychuk accused in lack of support for Karpaty)
Oleksandr Shevchenko, "the Smaliychuk's representatives were explaining that the only way to save Karpaty is to register the club from Ivano-Frankivsk Oblast in Lviv (Александр Шевченко: Представители Смалийчука объясняли, что единственный путь спасения Карпат — это зарегистрировать клуб из Ивано-Франковской области во Львове). Sport Arena. 25 August 2020.; 
Oleksandr Shevchenko, "In situation with "Karpaty" it disturbs me whether or not it is another oligarchs' game, part of which is Smaliychuk (Александр Шевченко: В ситуации с Карпатами меня смущает, не очередная ли это игра олигархов, частью которой и является Смалийчук?). Sport Arena. 25 August 2020.
 Artur Malkin. Oleh Luzhny, "Co-owner of Karpaty Smaliychuk is psychically unbalanced person" (Олег Лужний: "Співвласник "Карпат" Смалійчук – психічно неврівноважена людина"). Footboom. 26 August 2020.
Luzhny, "I can argue that Smaliychuk does not appear as an owner of Karpaty, because someone stands behind him" (Лужный: "Могу поспорить: Смалийчук не является совладельцем Карпат, за ним кто-то стоит"). Sport Arena. 26 August 2020.
 Myron Markevych, "Beside Mykhailiv, I know at least two-three other people who wanted to buy Karpaty" (Мирон Маркевич: "Окрім Михайліва, знаю ще двох-трьох людей, які хотіли купити "Карпати"). Footboom. 26 August 2020.
We are starting to get ready for massive renovation. "Karpaty" will live ("Починаємо готуватись до масштабного оновлення. "Карпати" будуть жити"). FC Karpaty Lviv. 22 August 2020.
 Artem Fedetskyi, "In Karpaty they want that debts were left on the new emblem. It is just another Smaliychuk's scheme (Артем Федецкий: «В «Карпатах» хотят, чтобы долги остались на новой эмблеме. Это еще одна авантюра Смалийчука»). Tribuna.com. 12 August 2020.

 
Ukrainian First League clubs
Football clubs in Lviv
Association football clubs established in 1963
1963 establishments in Ukraine
Soviet Top League clubs
Football clubs in the Ukrainian Soviet Socialist Republic